Kim Young-mi may refer to:
 Youngmi Kim (born 1954), South Korean soprano
 Kim Young-mi (sport shooter) (born 1960), South Korean sport shooter
 Kim Yeong-mi (born 1991), South Korean curler
 Kim Young-mi (table tennis), South Korean table tennis international

See also
Kim Yong-mi (disambiguation)